KESR (107.1 FM, "107.1 Bob FM") is a radio station located in Redding, California broadcasting to Shasta & Tehama Counties.  The station is licensed to Results Radio of Redding Licensee, LLC.

This station has gone through many format changes.  For several years it was called "Star 107.1" and was an "adult contemporary" station with local shows.  In 2005, it became an "adult hits" formatted "Jack FM" station. On March 12, 2010, Bob FM replaced Jack FM on 107.1, making it the second station owned by Results Radio to do so.

The station's construction permit was originally licensed by the Federal Communications Commission (FCC) to long-time North State broadcaster Steve Thomas   and then the license was transferred to McCarthy Wireless, Inc. (licensee of other Redding area radio stations).

Prior to being assigned by the FCC the call sign (call letters) of KESR, the station was originally licensed as KISK .

Translators
KESR broadcasts on the following translator:

External links
KESR official website

ESR
Adult hits radio stations in the United States